The Octavio Frias de Oliveira bridge, commonly known as "Ponte Estaiada", is a cable-stayed bridge in São Paulo, Brazil over the Pinheiros River, opened in May 2008. It is named after Octavio Frias de Oliveira.

Details

The bridge deck is unusual due to its form, which is similar to an "X", crossing at the tower. The "X" is 76 meters wide at its base and 35.4 meters wide at the top.

It is the only bridge in the world that has two curved tracks supported by a single concrete mast. The two curved tracks, one
at an elevation of 12 meters and the other at an elevation of 24 meters, have approximate lengths of 900 meters each.

At the end of December, lights are put up on the cables and illuminated to create color effects like those on a Christmas tree. The bridge is also lit up on special occasions during the year and is often used for automobile advertisements on television.

The bridge has been attacked by vandals on several occasions. In 2011, thieves stole  of wire, worth R$200,000 (US$117,000). Later in August, vandals broke in the bridge's control room and destroyed the panels. On January 9, 2012, vandals stole 94 of the 142 searchlights of the bridge. It will take 90 days and R$1,000,000 (around US$250,000) to completely re-establish the lighting system.

References

External links

New bridge photo, with some useful text

Cable-stayed bridges in Brazil
Bridges in São Paulo
Tourist attractions in São Paulo
Transport in São Paulo